County Route 554 (CR 554) is a county highway in the U.S. state of New Jersey. The highway extends  from Barnegat Boulevard (Route 72) to Main Street (U.S. Route 9 or US 9) in Barnegat Township.  The highway was designated as the easternmost segment of CR 532 in the early 1950s and was later a portion of CR 534, but as it had no connection to the western segment, it was renamed by 1984.

Route description

CR 554 begins at an intersection with Route 72 in Barnegat Township, heading east on two-lane undivided Barnegat Road. The road runs through forested areas of the Pine Barrens and intersects CR 611. Farther to the east, the route runs near wooded neighborhoods as Bay Avenue, coming to junctions with CR 111 and CR 105. CR 554 comes to a partial interchange with the Garden State Parkway that has access to and from the northbound direction of the parkway. After the interchange, CR 554 passes through business areas and intersects CR 8 and CR 10. In the community of Barnegat, the route comes to its eastern terminus at US 9.

Major intersections

See also

References

External links 

NJ State Highways: CR 545-560

554
554